Tomasetti may refer to
Glen Tomasetti (1929–2003), Australian singer-songwriter, author and political activist
Lou Tomasetti (1916–2004), American football running back 
Thornton Tomasetti, an American engineering consulting firm

See also
Tomassetti, a surname